Skålebreen is a glacier flowing north between Festninga Mountain and Mount Hochlin in the Mühlig-Hofmann Mountains in Queen Maud Land. Mapped by Norwegian cartographers from surveys and air photos by the Norwegian Antarctic Expedition (1956–60) and named Skålebreen.

See also
 List of glaciers in the Antarctic
 Glaciology

References

Glaciers of Queen Maud Land
Princess Martha Coast